In music, a counter-melody (often countermelody) is a sequence of notes, perceived as a melody, written to be played simultaneously with a more prominent lead melody. In other words, it is a secondary melody played in counterpoint with the primary melody. A counter-melody performs a subordinate role, and it is typically heard in a texture consisting of a melody plus accompaniment.

In marches, the counter-melody is often given to the trombones  or horns. American composer David Wallis Reeves is credited with this innovation in 1876.  

The more formal term countersubject applies to a secondary or subordinate melodic idea in a fugue. A countermelody differs from a harmony part sung by a backup singer in that whereas the harmony part typically lacks its own independent musical line, a countermelody is a distinct melodic line.

See also
Nebenstimme
Parallel harmony
Traditional sub-Saharan African harmony

References

Accompaniment
Melody